"Mondo Capellone" (Hippie World) is a song by Italian beat group Gli Spioni which was first published as a single in 1966, in the 45rpm Mondo Capellone/La Vera Identità and later as part of the album In Un Mondo Capellone.

Mondo Capellone entered the 1966 Cantagiro music contest.

Track listing
Italy Retail 7"
"Mondo Capellone"
"La vera Identità"

Personnel
Renato Fumagalli – lead vocals, guitar
Lippo Artusi – rhythm guitar
Artemide Palafrenieri – bass guitar
Franco Cisti – drums

1966 singles
1966 songs
Song articles with missing songwriters